Jackson Township is one of twenty current townships in Boone County, Arkansas, USA. As of the 2010 census, its total population was 1,340.

Geography

Cities, towns, and villages
Harrison (small part)

Population history
The township was part of Carroll County during the 1860 census. Part of the city of Harrison overlays Jackson Township according to the 1980 US Census going forward.

References
 United States Census Bureau 2008 TIGER/Line Shapefiles
 United States Board on Geographic Names (GNIS)
 United States National Atlas

 Census 2010 U.S. Gazetteer Files: County Subdivisions in Arkansas

External links
 US-Counties.com
 City-Data.com

Townships in Boone County, Arkansas
Townships in Arkansas